Ana Marija Marović (1815–1887) was a Serbian  writer and painter in Italy and Montenegro.  She knew the Italian and Serbian languages.

References

1815 births
1887 deaths
19th-century Italian painters
19th-century Italian women writers
19th-century Italian women artists